Catawba is an unincorporated community in Marion County, West Virginia, United States.

The community's name commemorates the Catawba people.

References 

Unincorporated communities in West Virginia
Unincorporated communities in Marion County, West Virginia
West Virginia populated places on the Monongahela River